Rupela is a genus of moths of the family Crambidae.

Species
Rupela adunca Heinrich, 1937
Rupela albina Becker & Solis, 1990
Rupela antonia Heinrich, 1937
Rupela bendis Heinrich, 1937
Rupela candace Heinrich, 1937
Rupela canens Heinrich, 1937
Rupela cornigera Heinrich, 1937
Rupela drusilla Heinrich, 1937
Rupela edusa Heinrich, 1937
Rupela faustina Heinrich, 1937
Rupela gaia Heinrich, 1937
Rupela gibbera Heinrich, 1937
Rupela herie Heinrich, 1937
Rupela horridula Heinrich, 1937
Rupela imitativa Heinrich, 1937
Rupela jana Heinrich, 1937
Rupela labeosa Heinrich, 1937
Rupela lara Heinrich, 1937
Rupela leucatea (Zeller, 1863)
Rupela liberta Heinrich, 1937
Rupela lumaria Heinrich, 1937
Rupela maenas Heinrich, 1937
Rupela monstrata Heinrich, 1937
Rupela nereis Heinrich, 1937
Rupela nivea Walker, 1863
Rupela orbona Heinrich, 1937
Rupela pallidula Heinrich, 1937
Rupela procula Heinrich, 1937
Rupela saetigera Heinrich, 1937
Rupela scitula Heinrich, 1937
Rupela segrega Heinrich, 1937
Rupela sejuncta Heinrich, 1937
Rupela spinifera Heinrich, 1937
Rupela tinctella Walker, 1863
Rupela vexativa Heinrich, 1937

References

Natural History Museum Lepidoptera genus database

Schoenobiinae
Crambidae genera
Taxa named by Francis Walker (entomologist)